Aisha Sheppard (born November 13, 1998) is an American professional basketball player who plays for the Las Vegas Aces in the Women's National Basketball Association (WNBA). She played college basketball at Virginia Tech.

College career
Sheppard came out of high school as the Gatorade Player of the Year for Washington, D.C., as well as the 34th rated recruit of the 2017 Class per ESPN's HoopGurlz rankings.

During Sheppard's freshman year, she became known as a 3-point sharpshooter. She led the team with 76 3-pointers made during the year. On February 22, 2018, Sheppard rained in 7 3-pointers vs. Notre Dame - which tied the program record for most 3's in a game.

Sheppard began her sophomore campaign doing similar things as her freshman year - being a shooter. She continued her be a sniper from outside knocking down 59 threes this year to move into 8th place All-Time in program history. Sheppard scored 17 points against 13th rank Miami on February 21, to give the Hokies a signature win.

During her junior year, Sheppard moved into the starting lineup full-time and averaged double digits for the first time in her career. Sheppard averaged 14.8 points and 3.1 rebounds. Once again, she proved to be one of the best shooters in the ACC, as well as the NCAA. She finished behind Dana Evans in both percentage and 3-pointer made per game. Sheppard was named to the All-ACC Second Team for her outstanding year.

Sheppard continued her upward trend into her senior year, once again starting all the games for the Hokies. She averaged 17.7 points, 2.7 rebounds, and 3.0 assists. On January 28, 2021, Sheppard helped led the Hokies to a win over #2 NC State. She scored 28 points to help the Hokies to Virginia Tech's high ever AP ranked win.

After graduating from Virginia Tech, Sheppard decided to use her extra-COVID year of eligibility and return to the Hokies for one more year. Sheppard cemented her status on one of the best 3-point shooters in ACC History on February 13, 2022, when she passed AD's ACC record for career 3-point field goals made with 375. Sheppard was named to the All-ACC Second Team once again this year.

Sheppard finished her career as the program's All-Time Leading Scorer with 1,883 points, as well as taking over the ACC 3-Point Record for Makes with 402.

College statistics

Professional career

Las Vegas Aces
In the 2022 WNBA Draft, Sheppard was taken 23rd overall by the Las Vegas Aces.

WNBA career statistics

Regular season

|-
|style="text-align:left;background:#afe6ba;"| 2022†
| align="left" | Las Vegas
| 23 || 0 || 7.6 || .238 || .273 || .750 || 0.6 || 0.3 || 0.2 || 0.0 || 0.3 || 1.5
|-
| align="left" | Career
| align="left" | 1 year, 1 team
| 23 || 0 || 7.6 || .238 || .273 || .750 || 0.6 || 0.3 || 0.2 || 0.0 || 0.3 || 1.5

Playoffs

|-
|style="text-align:left;background:#afe6ba;"| 2022†
| align="left" | Las Vegas
| 4 || 0 || 4.0 || .000 || .000 || .000 || 0.0 || 0.8 || 0.0 || 0.0 || 0.5 || 0.0
|-
| align="left" | Career
| align="left" | 1 year, 1 team
| 4 || 0 || 4.0 || .000 || .000 || .000 || 0.0 || 0.8 || 0.0 || 0.0 || 0.5 || 0.0

References

External links
WNBA bio
Virginia Tech Hokies bio

1998 births
Living people
American women's basketball players
Basketball players from Virginia
Guards (basketball)
Virginia Tech Hokies women's basketball players
Las Vegas Aces draft picks
Las Vegas Aces players
People from Alexandria, Virginia